The 1957 World Archery Championships was the 18th edition of the event. It was held in Prague, Czechoslovakia on 18–21 July 1957 and was organised by World Archery Federation (FITA).

All individual medals were won by archers from the United States. It also marked the first Championship where archers from one country won all events, a feat the United States went on to repeat in 1959, 1961, and 1963.

Medals summary

Recurve

Medals table

References

External links
 World Archery website
 Complete results

World Championship
World Archery
A
World Archery Championships
Archery competitions in Czechoslovakia